Allajbegi's Mosque is a historical Cultural Monument of Albania, located in Burim (Allajbegi), Dibër County. The mosque was built before 1578. It became a Cultural Monument in 1970.

References 

Cultural Monuments of Albania
Mosques in Albania
Buildings and structures in Dibër (municipality)